Sushila Rohatgi (21 August 1921 – 9 April 2011) was a leader of Indian National Congress. She was a union minister of India. She was a great granddaughter of Madan Mohan Malviya  and was elected to Lok Sabha from Uttar Pradesh twice and was also elected to Rajya Sabha in 1985.

References

1921 births
2011 deaths
Lok Sabha members from Uttar Pradesh
Women members of the Uttar Pradesh Legislative Assembly
India MPs 1971–1977
India MPs 1967–1970
Rajya Sabha members from Uttar Pradesh
Uttar Pradesh MLAs 1962–1967
Leaders of the Opposition in the Uttar Pradesh Legislative Council
20th-century Indian women politicians
20th-century Indian politicians
People from Kanpur Nagar district
Women members of the Lok Sabha
Women members of the Rajya Sabha
Indian National Congress politicians from Uttar Pradesh